Joseph Orlean Christian (May 10, 1898 – October 21, 1979) was an American football, basketball, and baseball coach and college athletics administrator.  He served as the head football coach at the University of Connecticut from 1934 to 1949 and as the head baseball coach there from 1936 to 1961.  Christian was also the school's athletic director from 1950 to 1966 and filled in as interim head basketball coach during the 1935–36 season.   He served as the first commissioner of the Yankee Conference, from 1966 to 1971.  Christian died on October 21, 1979 at the age of 81 in a convalescent home in Willimantic, Connecticut.  The University of Connecticut's home baseball field, J. O. Christian Field, is named in his honor.  Christian's 66 wins as head football coach at Connecticut were the most in program history until Randy Edsall surpassed him in 2010.

Head coaching record

Football

Basketball

Baseball
The following table depicts Christian's record as head baseball coach at Connecticut.

References

External links
 

1898 births
1979 deaths
UConn Huskies athletic directors
UConn Huskies baseball coaches
UConn Huskies football coaches
UConn Huskies men's basketball coaches
Yankee Conference commissioners
Junior college football coaches in the United States
People from Story County, Iowa